Holiday is a surname. Notable people with the surname include:

 Aaron Holiday (born 1996), basketball player
 Billie Holiday (1915–1959), American singer
 Bob Holiday (1932–2017), played Superman in the 1966 Broadway musical
 Carlyle Holiday (born 1981), American football wide receiver
 Clarence Holiday (1898–1937), American musician and the probable father of singer, Billie Holiday
 Eugene Holiday, first Governor of Sint Maarten
 Fredrick William Holiday (1920–1979), British journalist, angler, cryptozoologist, and wildlife specialist
 Harry Holiday (1924–1999), world record holder in the backstroke in the 1940s and a president of steelmaker American Rolling Mill Co. (Armco)
 Henry Holiday (1839–1927), English artist
 Hope Holiday (born 1938), born in New York, NY
 J. Holiday (born 1982), American R&B singer-songwriter
 Joe Holiday (1925–2016), American jazz saxophonist born in Sicily
 Johnny Holiday (1912–2009), American actor
 Jrue Holiday (born 1990), basketball player; husband of Lauren
 Justin Holiday (born 1989), basketball player
 Lauren Holiday (born 1987), soccer player
 Philip Holiday (born 1970), professional junior middleweight boxer
 Tasha Holiday, R&B singer who was signed to MCA Records in the 1990s
 Tony Holiday (1951–1990), German pop singer and songwriter

See also
Holliday (name)

English-language surnames
Surnames of Scottish origin